June Carter Cash (born Valerie June Carter; June 23, 1929 – May 15, 2003) was an American singer, songwriter and dancer. A five-time Grammy award-winner, she was a member of the Carter Family and the second wife of singer Johnny Cash. Prior to her marriage to Cash, she was professionally known as June Carter and occasionally was still credited as such after her marriage (as well as on songwriting credits predating it). She played guitar, banjo, harmonica, and autoharp, and acted in several films and television shows. Carter Cash won five Grammy Awards and was inducted into the Christian Music Hall of Fame in 2009.

Early life
June Carter Cash was born Valerie June Carter in Maces Spring, Virginia, to Maybelle (née Addington) and Ezra Carter. Her parents were country music performers and she performed with the Carter Family from the age of 10, in 1939. In March 1943, when the Carter Family trio stopped recording together at the end of the WBT contract, Maybelle Carter, with encouragement from her husband Ezra, formed "Mother Maybelle and the Carter Sisters" with her daughters, Helen, Anita, and June. The new group first aired on radio station WRNL in Richmond, Virginia, on June 1. Doc (Addington) and Carl (McConnell)—Maybelle's brother and cousin, respectively, known as "The Virginia Boys", joined them in late 1945. June, then 16, was a co-announcer with Ken Allyn and did the commercials on the radio shows for Red Star Flour, Martha White, and Thalhimers Department Store, just to name a few. For the next year, the Carters and Doc and Carl did show dates within driving range of Richmond, through Virginia, Maryland, Delaware, and Pennsylvania. She attended John Marshall High School during this period. June later said she had to work harder at her music than her sisters, but she had her own special talent —comedy. A highlight of the road shows was her "Aunt Polly" comedy routine. With her thin and lanky frame, June Carter often played a comedic foil during the group's performances alongside other Opry stars Faron Young and Webb Pierce. Carl McConnell wrote in his memoirs that June was "a natural-born clown, if there ever was one". Decades later, Carter revived Aunt Polly for the 1976 TV series Johnny Cash & Friends.

After Doc and Carl dropped out of the music business in late 1946, Maybelle and her daughters moved to Sunshine Sue Workman's "Old Dominion Barn Dance" on the WRVA Richmond station. After a while there, they moved to WNOX in Knoxville, Tennessee, where they met Chet Atkins with Homer and Jethro.

In 1949, Mother Maybelle and the Carter Sisters, with their lead guitarist, Atkins, were living in Springfield, Missouri, and performing regularly at KWTO. Ezra "Eck" Carter, Maybelle's husband and manager of the group, declined numerous offers from the Grand Ole Opry to move the act to Nashville, Tennessee, because the Opry would not permit Atkins to accompany the group onstage. Atkins' reputation as a guitar player had begun to spread, and studio musicians were fearful that he would displace them as a 'first-call' player if he came to Nashville. Finally, in 1950, Opry management relented and the group, along with Atkins, became part of the Opry company. Here the family befriended Hank Williams and Elvis Presley (to whom they were distantly related), and June met Johnny Cash.

June and her sisters, with mother Maybelle and aunt Sara joining in from time to time, reclaimed the name "The Carter Family" for their act during the 1960s and '70s.

Career highlights

While June Carter Cash may be best known for singing and songwriting, she was also an author, dancer, actress, comedian, philanthropist, and humanitarian. Director Elia Kazan saw her perform at the Grand Ole Opry in 1955 and encouraged her to study acting. She studied with Lee Strasberg and Sanford Meisner at the Neighborhood Playhouse School of the Theatre in New York. Her acting roles included Mrs. "Momma" Dewey in Robert Duvall's 1998 movie The Apostle, Sister Ruth, wife to Johnny Cash's character Kid Cole, on Dr. Quinn, Medicine Woman (1993–97), and Clarise on Gunsmoke in 1957. She was notable as Mayhayley Lancaster playing alongside husband Cash in the 1983 television movie Murder in Coweta County. June was also Momma James in The Last Days of Frank and Jesse James. She also acted in occasional comedy skits for various Johnny Cash TV programs.

As a singer, she had both a solo career and a career singing with first her family and later her husband. As a solo artist, she became somewhat successful with upbeat country tunes of the 1950s such as "Jukebox Blues" and, with her exaggerated breaths, the comedic hit "No Swallerin' Place" by Frank Loesser. June also recorded "The Heel" in the 1960s along with many other songs.

In the early 1960s, June Carter wrote the song "Ring of Fire", which later went on to be a hit for her future husband, Johnny Cash. She co-wrote the song with fellow songwriter Merle Kilgore. June wrote the lyrics about her relationship with Johnny Cash and she offered the song to her sister Anita Carter, who was the first singer to record the song. In 1963, Johnny recorded the song with the Carter Family singing backup, and added mariachi horns. The song became a number-one hit and went on to become one of the most recognizable songs in the world of country music.
In her autobiography, “I Walked the Line”, Johnny's first wife Vivian Cash disputes the myth that June Carter co-wrote the song, "Ring of Fire". Vivian relates the story that Johnny told her in 1963 that he wrote the song with Merle Kilgore and Curly while fishing and that he was going to give June half credit because “She needs the money. And I like her.”

Her first notable studio performance with Johnny Cash occurred in 1964 when she duetted with Cash on "It Ain't Me Babe", a Bob Dylan composition, that was released as a single and on Cash's album Orange Blossom Special. In 1967, the two found more substantial success with their recording of "Jackson", which was followed by a collaboration album, Carryin' On with Johnny Cash and June Carter. All these releases antedated her marriage to Cash (upon which event she changed her professional name to June Carter Cash). She continued to work with Cash on record and on stage for the rest of her life, recording a number of duets with Cash for his various albums and being a regular on The Johnny Cash Show from 1969 to 1971 and on Cash's annual Christmas specials. After Carryin' On, June Carter Cash recorded one more direct collaboration album, Johnny Cash and His Woman, released in 1973, and along with her daughters was a featured vocalist on Cash's 1974 album The Junkie and the Juicehead Minus Me. She also shared sleeve credit with her husband on a 2000 small-label gospel release, Return to the Promised Land

Although she provided vocals on many recordings, and shared the billing with Cash on several album releases, June Carter Cash only recorded three solo albums during her lifetime: the first, Appalachian Pride, released in 1975, Press On (1999), and Wildwood Flower, released posthumously in 2003 and produced by her son, John Carter Cash. Appalachian Pride is the only one of the three on which Johnny Cash does not perform, while Press On is notable for featuring June Carter Cash singing her original arrangement of "Ring of Fire".

One of her final appearances was a nonspeaking/nonsinging appearance in the music video for her husband's 2003 single, "Hurt", filmed a few months before her death. One of her last known public appearances was on April 7, 2003, just over a month before her death, when she appeared on the CMT Flameworthy awards program to accept an achievement award on behalf of her husband, who was too ill to attend.

She won a Grammy award in 1999 for, Press On. Her last album, Wildwood Flower, won two additional Grammys. It contains bonus video enhancements showing extracts from the film of the recording sessions, which took place at the Carter Family estate in Hiltons, Virginia, on September 18–20, 2002. The songs on the album include "Big Yellow Peaches", "Sinking in the Lonesome Sea", "Temptation", and the trademark staple "Wildwood Flower". Due to her involvement in providing backing vocals on many of her husband's recordings, a further posthumous release occurred in 2014, when Out Among the Stars was released under Johnny Cash's name. The album consists of previously unreleased recordings from the early 1980s, including two on which June Carter Cash provides duet vocals.

Her autobiography was published in 1979, and she wrote a memoir, From the Heart, almost 10 years later.

Personal life

Carter was married three times and had one child with each husband. All three of her children went on to have successful careers in country music. She was married first to country singer Carl Smith from July 9, 1952, until their divorce in 1956. Together, they wrote "Time's A-Wastin". They had a daughter, Rebecca Carlene Smith, professionally known as Carlene Carter, a country musician. June's second marriage was to Edwin "Rip" Nix, a former football player and police officer on November 11, 1957. They had a daughter, Rosie Nix Adams, on July 13, 1958. The couple divorced in 1966. Rosie was a country/rock singer. On October 24, 2003, Rosie, aged 45, died from accidental carbon monoxide poisoning. She and bluegrass musician Jimmy Campbell were on a school bus, which had been converted for travel. Several propane heaters were being used to heat the bus.

Carter and the entire Carter Family had performed with Johnny Cash for a number of years. In 1968, Cash proposed to Carter during a live performance at the London Ice House in London, Ontario. They married on March 1 in Franklin, Kentucky, and remained married until her death in May 2003, just four months before Cash died. The couple's son, John Carter Cash, is a musician, songwriter, and producer. In addition, she gained four stepdaughters from her husband’s previous marriage to Vivian Liberto; including Cindy and Rosanne.

Carter's distant cousin, the 39th U.S. president Jimmy Carter, became closely acquainted with Cash and Carter and maintained their friendship throughout their lifetimes. In a June 1977 speech, Jimmy Carter acknowledged that June Carter was his distant cousin.

Carter was a longtime supporter of SOS Children's Villages. In 1974, the Cashes donated money to help build a village near their home in Barrett Town, Jamaica, which they visited frequently, playing the guitar and singing songs to the children in the village.

June Carter Cash also had close relationships with a number of entertainers, including Audrey Williams, James Dean, Patsy Cline, Loretta Lynn, Jessi Colter, Kris Kristofferson, Willie Nelson, Elvis Presley, Robert Duvall, and Roy Orbison.

Death
Carter died in Nashville, Tennessee, on May 15, 2003, at the age of 73, from complications following heart-valve replacement surgery, surrounded by her family, including her husband of 35 years, Johnny Cash. At Carter's funeral, her stepdaughter Rosanne Cash stated, "If being a wife were a corporation, June would have been a CEO. It was her most treasured role." Johnny Cash died four months after Carter's death, and Carter's daughter, Rosie Nix Adams, a month after that. All three are buried at the Hendersonville Memory Gardens near their home in Hendersonville, Tennessee.

Awards
Carter and her future husband, Johnny Cash, reached number 2 on the U.S. Country charts with their 1967 duet of "Jackson". Their performance won the 1968 Grammy Award for Best Country & Western Performance Duet, Trio or Group. The two won the 1971 Grammy Award, for Best Country Vocal Performance by a Duo or Group, for their 1970 duet "If I Were a Carpenter".

Carter Cash won the 2000 Grammy Award, for Best Traditional Folk Album, for her 1999 album Press On. The album was a top-15 success on the Americana chart. Carter Cash's last album, Wildwood Flower, was released posthumously in 2003. Carter Cash won the 2004 Grammy Award for Best Traditional Folk Album, and she also won the 2004 Grammy Award for Best Female Country Vocal Performance for the single "Keep on the Sunny Side".

Philanthropy 
June Carter Cash along with her husband, Johnny Cash, worked with and gave money to the group, SOS Children's Villages, throughout their life. They began this involvement in 1973 when they donated $12,000 ($75,351 in 2022 terms) to build an orphanage in a Jamaican village close to their home in that country. They would visit the nearby village during their time spent in Jamaica and play with the children and sing songs to them. When Johnny Cash died in 2003, their family asked that donations be made to the SOS Children's Villages due to the couple's involvement. In a quote from a representative of the Prime Minister of Jamaica at the time, P.J. Patterson, talks about their charitable works in the country, "A philanthropist extraordinaire, Mrs. Cash made Jamaica her second home and loved and cared deeply for the people of her adopted country. A gifted and talented singer, she and her husband, Johnny Cash, used the very talents for the benefit of many charities in and around Montego Bay."

Legacy
In 2003, Carter was included by Country Music Television on their list of the "40 Greatest Women of Country Music".

June Carter was played by Reese Witherspoon in Walk the Line, a 2005 biographical film of Johnny Cash (played by Joaquin Phoenix). The film largely focused on the development of their relationship over the course of 13 years, from their first meeting to her final acceptance of his proposal of marriage. Witherspoon performed all vocals for the role, singing many of June's famous songs, including "Juke Box Blues" and "Jackson" with Phoenix. Witherspoon won an Academy Award, Golden Globe, BAFTA and Screen Actors Guild Award for Best Actress in the role.

Musician and actress Jewel portrayed June Carter Cash in the Lifetime television movie Ring of Fire, which aired on May 27, 2013. The film is based on John Carter Cash's memoir Anchored in Love: An Intimate Portrait of June Carter Cash.

June was played by Erin Beute in the 2019 television movie Patsy & Loretta.

Discography

Albums

Albums with Johnny Cash
 Note: this list only lists albums on which June Carter Cash received co-billing. Most 1970s and 1980s album releases by Cash featured at least one duet with her, and/or she provided backing vocals.

Singles

Singles with Johnny Cash

Featured singles

Music videos

References

Bibliography
 .

Further reading
 .
 .
 . Background for liner notes for a Doc and Carl album recorded at Johnny Cash's Nashville studio. Online at 
 .

External links

June Carter Cash Official Site
 .
 
 .
Official Carter Family Fold Website
 

1929 births
2003 deaths
20th-century American singers
21st-century American singers
People from Nashville, Tennessee
People from Scott County, Virginia
American women country singers
American country singer-songwriters
American female dancers
Dancers from Virginia
American banjoists
Country musicians from Virginia
Country musicians from Tennessee
Burials in Tennessee
Grammy Award winners
American autoharp players
Grand Ole Opry members
Liberty Records artists
Johnny Cash
Cash–Carter family
American folk singers
Guitarists from Virginia
The Carter Family members
20th-century American women singers
20th-century American guitarists
21st-century American women singers
20th-century American women guitarists
Singer-songwriters from Tennessee
Singer-songwriters from Virginia